Let's Go to Prison is a 2006 American comedy film directed by Bob Odenkirk and starring Dax Shepard, Will Arnett and Chi McBride. The film was loosely based on the non-fiction book, You Are Going to Prison by Jim Hogshire. It was released in theatres November 17, 2006. The film received mostly negative reviews and was not financially successful.

Plot
After serving three prison sentences, repeat offender John Lyshitski plots revenge on Judge Nelson Biederman III, a tough judge who presided over each of his trials, passing him stiff sentences. John calls the courthouse to determine when he will next preside over a case, only to discover that he died three days before John's release.

John turns his attention to the late judge's obnoxious son, Nelson Biederman IV. At a dedication ceremony for Judge Biederman, he breaks into Nelson's car, emptying his emergency inhaler. After the ceremony, John stalks him in his van and a hyperventilating Nelson frantically searches through a pharmacy's shelves for a new inhaler. His erratic behavior horrifies the owners, who think he is a junkie. 

After Nelson finally finds an inhaler, he uses it; then he holds it up to prove he means no harm, but the pharmacy owners mistake it for a pistol and call the police. John fires a real shot into the air. The gunshot further terrifies the shop owners, who think Nelson is shooting at them. The police arrive and arrest Nelson. John is ecstatic that Nelson has landed in the criminal justice system which he suffered in for so long at the hands of Nelson's father.

Nelson is charged with felony assault. Demanding that the Biederman Foundation get him acquitted, the board nearly complies. However, as they are fed up with him, they realize they can get rid of him. They purposely provide Nelson with a grossly incompetent defense team at the trial. The incompetent jury find Nelson guilty and he is sentenced to three to five years in state prison. 

John, not satisfied with Nelson merely going to prison, decides to join him there by purposely selling narcotics to undercover cops. At his trial before the same judge Nelson had, John pleads guilty and convinces her he be sentenced to three to five years in the same prison as Nelson. He becomes Nelson's cellmate, pretends to be his friend, and gives Nelson terrible advice on surviving in prison.

Despite being an unhardened and inexperienced prisoner, Nelson gets himself out of the many situations that John's misinformation creates. He meets gang leader Barry, an imposing, brawny gay fellow who coerces him into a relationship. Despite his intimidating appearance, Barry is a sensitive romantic, supplying potential romantic partners with his finest toilet-made Merlot.

Nelson angers white supremacist gang leader Lynard, who vows to kill him. He gets his hands on a syringe containing deadly chemical, to commit suicide. Before he can do so, Lynard attacks him in his cell. The syringe falls out of Nelson's pocket, Lynard assumes it is heroin and injects himself, accidentally killing himself and Nelson earns the respect of and authority over the white supremacists, who believe Nelson had done it. 

Nelson reaches his one-year parole hearing relatively unharmed, and as the new leader of the white supremacist gang for "killing" Lynard, who was violent and spiteful towards everyone including his fellow white supremacists. Nelson, who initially submits to being Barry's partner out of fear, grows to care for him, willingly playing along with the "relationship" to keep him happy. Nelson also protects Barry from Lynard's former cronies, who are now loyal to him.

Frustrated with Nelson's newfound respect, John drugs Nelson and tattoos "white power" onto his forehead, causing Nelson's parole to be denied. Enraged, Nelson confronts John, who then confesses to causing him to end up in jail, so they get into a fight. John quickly realizes that he is now Nelson's target. The guards set up a death match between them. John and Nelson secretly hatch a plan to inject each other with a coma-inducing drug. The guards and prisoners believe they are dead and bury them. 

Just before the death match, Nelson had legally adopted Barry, who has been paroled, so he retakes control of the Biederman Foundation. Barry uses the Biederman Foundation's funds to bribe the mortician to skip the autopsy and later also digs up John and Nelson. John, Nelson and Barry begin a new chapter of life, starting a winery (the product is "toilet wine").

Cast
 Dax Shepard as John Lyshitski
 Will Arnett as Nelson Biederman IV
 Chi McBride as Barry
 David Koechner as Shanahan
 Dylan Baker as Warden
 Michael Shannon as Lynard
 David Darlow as Judge Nelson Biederman III
 Bob Odenkirk as Duane
 A. J. Balance as John Lyshitski – 18 years
 Michael Hitchcock as Wine Taster
 Tim Heidecker as Wine Taster
 Eric Wareheim as Wine Taster

Production notes
The defunct Joliet Prison in Joliet, Illinois used for the film is the same prison featured in the beginning of The Blues Brothers (1980) and the first season of the Fox show Prison Break (2005).

During the end credits, Chi McBride in character as Barry, sings a song called "Shower with U" (credited as "Barry's Love Theme" on the soundtrack) in which he repeatedly sings "I wanna take a shower with you".

The studio made significant alterations during the film's editing process that made Odenkirk unhappy with the final result (which also happened with the Mr. Show with Bob and David film, Run Ronnie Run, which Odenkirk wrote). According to writers Tom Lennon and Robert Ben Garant's appearance on the Nerdist Podcast from August 23, 2011, changes included a happier ending, the removal of a sparse drums-only score recorded by Meg White of The White Stripes, and other alterations that made a significant change to the overall tone of the film.

Reception
Let's Go to Prison received mostly negative reviews. On Rotten Tomatoes the film has an approval rating of 12% based on 41 reviews. The consensus states: "Let's Go to Prison is guilty on all counts of clichéd setups, base humor, and failure to ellicit laughs." Metacritic gives it a score of 27 out of 100 sampled from 13 critics, indicating "generally unfavorable reviews".

Dennis Harvey of Variety wrote: "Unlike the vast majority of rude bigscreen comedies these days, "Prison" may actually improve with repeat viewings, since its best aspects are offhand enough to be missed the first time around."
Frank Scheck of The Hollywood Reporter did not find the film funny "the few laughs this purported comedy contains are fully displayed in its far more amusing trailer".

Box Office Mojo reports that the film opened in 11th place with a meager take of $2,220,050. It closed with a domestic gross of $4,630,045.

Home media
The film was released on DVD March 6, 2007 with deleted scenes and an alternate ending.

References

External links

 
 

2006 comedy films
2006 films
American LGBT-related films
American prison comedy films
Films about race and ethnicity
Films set in prison
2000s prison films
Universal Pictures films
Films based on non-fiction books
Films produced by Marc Abraham
Films directed by Bob Odenkirk
2000s English-language films
2000s American films